I'll Take the Blame is the second major EP released by indie rock/new wave/indie pop group Tegan and Sara. The EP was first sold at shows during Tegan and Sara's fall 2008 tour of the United States.

PunkNews.org rated it 3/5, for fans only, criticising some of the material as second-rate.

Track listing 
 "Back in Your Head" (Sara Quin)
 "Back in Your Head" (Tiësto Remix)
 "One Second" (Tegan Quin)
 "I Take All the Blame" (S. Quin)

References

2007 EPs
Tegan and Sara albums